Leptostylus bruesi is a species of longhorn beetles of the subfamily Lamiinae. It was described by Fisher in 1942, and is known from Jamaica.

References

Leptostylus
Beetles described in 1942